Glenn Moody (born 19 June 1964 in Middlesbrough) is a former English professional darts player.

Career

Glenn had tried to qualify for the Lakeside nine times before finding success in the 2008 BDO World Darts Championship. He has been described as a "geek" by the press but he is received warmly by the crowds. His catchphrase "Whazza!" on throwing the double has resounded across the Lakeside since he won his first match there.

He beat Niels de Ruiter, the number sixteen seed, in the first round of the championship by three sets to one. He had a 76.80 average compared to de Ruiter's 74.04 average. This saw him through to the second round where he played Welshman and #1 seed Mark Webster. Webster was the eventual victor, winning by four sets to one. Glenn put up a fair fight in the match (and, in fact, had several opportunities to win the fourth and fifth sets due to Webster missing many attempts at doubles), coming out with an average of 80.13, just shy of Webster's 82.80. Although as Bobby George who was providing the commentary said, neither of the players played particularly good darts. Webster raised his game considerably afterwards and won the title.

Although never likely to win the tournament, Moody was still a surprise hit with the Lakeside fans. Entering the stage to the strains of Bronski Beat's camp disco song 'Hit That Perfect Beat' whilst wobbling his skinny legs. Moody caused an instant reaction. His skinny frame, crooked teeth and permanent grin, provided one of the most surreal and entertaining moments in sport. Most of the crowd caught into 'Moody Mania' by chanting his surname when he won a leg, which was started by a group of friends. Soon afterwards, the whole crowd joined in.

Moody has performed well in floor events in 2008, reaching the Last 32 in the Welsh Classic, the Welsh Masters and the British Open. Moody also attempted to qualify for the 2008 Grand Slam of Darts via the ITV Wildcard Qualifiers, but lost in his first match to Erwin Extercatte. Moody then failed to qualify for the 2009 Lakeside World Championship, winning two matches before losing to Paul Gibbs.

Personal life
Glenn is married to Lesley, a carer for the local council, and he is a house-husband who looks after son George at home. Due to his skinny build he is ironically nicknamed Mr Muscle.

World Championship Results

BDO

2008: 2nd Round (lost to Mark Webster 1-4)

References 
Moody hoping for another good year for house husbands, sport.guardian.co.uk. Accessed 10 January 2008
Glenn Moody eyes upset, mirror.co.uk. Accessed 10 January 2008

External links
Profile and stats on Darts Database

Sportspeople from Middlesbrough
English darts players
1964 births
Living people
British Darts Organisation players